4-Methylphenylisobutylamine (4-MAB), also known as 4-methyl-α-ethylphenethylamine, is a stimulant drug of the phenethylamine class.

See also 
 Phenylisobutylamine
 4-Methylamphetamine
 Benzodioxolylbutanamine

References 

Substituted amphetamines
Entactogens and empathogens
Serotonin-norepinephrine-dopamine releasing agents